Chamarajara Wodeyar II (Raja Hiriya Abiral Chamarajara Wodeyar II, 1463 – 1513) was fourth raja of the Kingdom of Mysore from 1478 until 1513.

Multiple superiors 
Chamaraja Wodeyar II succeeded his father Timmaraja Wodeyar I after his death in 1478. He ruled for 35 years, and a long-reigning monarch was mandated for the kingdom's survival by looming peril of Mughal and European invasions. During his 35-year reign, Chamaraja Wodeyar II ruled as feudatory monarch under three families and eight emperors, surpassing all his forefathers in ruling under most emperors.

Quick roll-overs and insubordination within Vijayanagara 
Soon after Virupaksha's death, Praudha Raya took over. Overpowered though he was, his subordinates exhibited insubordination. His own commander, his successor, and the founder of the Saluva dynasty, Saluva Narasimha Deva Raya, seized power from him and ascended the throne. Mysore had remained obedient to the Sangama family from the time Mysore government was constituted nearly a century ago. This was also the case with other feudatory governors. Disgruntling grew right within the Saluva family after Saluva Narasimha Deva Raya lost a major portion of eastern Andhra to a long-time Vijayanagara opponent: Raja Purushottama Gajapati Kapilendra of Odisha. Other subordinate governors also began raising against Vijayanagara. After Deva Raya's death, his son Thimma Bhupala, who was enthroned, but was, within weeks, assassinated by a commander during political unrest in the capital Vijayanagara, which brought his brother, Narasimha Raya II, into power.

During Narasimha Raya II's minority, Saluva Narasimha Deva Raya's confidant and colleague, Tuluva Narasa Nayaka, also a commander, played his regent, suppressing/silencing all the supporters of the old Sangama dynasty, including Chamaraja Wodeyar II. Tuluva Narasa Nayaka's son, Tuluva Vira Narasimha, same as Narasimha Raya II in age, when both came of age, fell out on differences over right to the throne. Soon after Tuluva Narasa Nayaka's death, Narasimha Raya II was ostensibly assassinated by Tuluva Vira Narasimha's henchmen. This led to the ruling of Vijayanagara by the Tuluva dynasty.

Beginning of Mysore revolt 
During all these developments, Chamaraja Wodeyar II had made minor profits in his rule, but mostly remained quiet about Vijayanagara, as did other feudal prefects. This obedience was further demanded by the growing power and might of Tuluva Narasimha Raya, who was 5 in wading off the northern Sultanates and other enemies. He defeated Yusuf Adil Khan of Bijapur Sultanate. However, over time, Chamaraja Wodeyar II, his chieftain in Ummattur, and other small political comptrollers rebelled against Tuluva Narasimha Raya, who, in his stead, placed Krishnadevaraya, and set South. In this conflict, the Portuguese joined hands with Tuluva Narasimha Raya, starting the first foreign intervention in Indian domestic affairs. The fallout of the battle was mixed. This introduced an air of insubordination amongst southern rulers and the empire. After Narasimha Raya's death in 1509, Chamaraja Wodeyar II again went silent to study the new emperor, Krishnadevaraya. However, in four years, Chamaraja Wodeyar II died at 50, in 1513, out of natural causes.

See also
 Wodeyar dynasty
 Tuluva dynasty
 Krishnadevaraya

1463 births
1513 deaths
Kings of Mysore
Chamaraja II